We Can Make a Difference is the third studio album by Witness.

Track listing

Charts

References

External links
  Witness (2) – We Can Make A Difference 
 Witness Discography

1990 albums
Witness (gospel group) albums